The 40th Group Army was a military formation of the People's Liberation Army, active in various forms from 1949 to 2017. It was last located in the Shenyang Military Region and the Northern Theater Command.

History

Korean War
During the Korean War, the 40th Army was part of the People's Volunteer Army. It was composed of the 118th, 119th, and 120th Divisions. 

In the morning of Oct. 25, the 118th Division of the 40th Army ambushed the 3rd Infantry Battalion of ROK 6th Division, destroying the ROK unit as an organized force. 

The 40th Army attacked the 9th and 38th Infantry Regiments of the U.S. 2nd Infantry Division about eighteen miles northeast of Kunu-ri along the Chongchon River.

Tiananmen Square Protests of 1989

In May 1989, the 40th Army's 118th Infantry Division and Artillery Brigade were deployed to Beijing to enforce martial law and suppress the Tiananmen Square protests of 1989.

According to reports, the 40th Army was disestablished in mid 2017. China Defense Blogspot said that its higher-readiness units with modern equipment were '..likely be merged with neighboring GAs.  [T]he 118th Combined Arms 8x8 Light Mechanized Infantry Brigade will likely to be part of the 39th GA moving forward.. Others units such as 119th and 191st Motorized Infantry Brigades with their older TOE will probably be disbanded all together.'

References

Field armies of the People's Volunteer Army
Field armies of the People's Liberation Army
Military units and formations established in the 1940s
Military units and formations disestablished in 2017